The 2002 Thurrock Council election took place on 2 May 2002 to elect members of Thurrock Council in Essex, England. One third of the council was up for election and the Labour party stayed in overall control of the council.

43 candidates stood in the election, with 16 of the 20 wards being contested. Both Conservative and Labour parties stood in all 16 seats, along with 7 Liberal Democrats, 3 Independents and 1 Green Party candidate.

After the election, the composition of the council was
Labour 37
Conservative 9
Independent 2
Liberal Democrat 1

Election result

Ward results

References

2002
2002 English local elections
2000s in Essex